Strong Reaction is the debut album of Pegboy. It was released in 1991 through Quarterstick Records.

Critical reception
Trouser Press wrote that "quibbles about the occasionally melodramatic lyrics, in which the passage into adulthood dissolves into tragedy, are obliterated by the ferocious attack."

In a retrospective review, The A.V. Club wrote: "Skirting grunge, pop-punk, post-hardcore, and emo—all of which were erupting at the time—Strong Reaction has aged with a rugged grace that puts most of its contemporaries to shame."

Track listing

Personnel 
Pegboy
Larry Damore – lead vocals, guitar
Joe Haggerty – drums
John Haggerty – guitar
Steve Saylors – bass guitar, backing vocals
Production and additional personnel
Iain Burgess – production, engineering
Michael Roberts – photography
Chuck Uchida – engineering

References

External links 
 

1991 debut albums
Albums produced by Iain Burgess
Quarterstick Records albums
Pegboy albums